Bega, an electoral district of the Legislative Assembly in the Australian state of New South Wales, has had two incarnations, the first from 1894 to 1920, the second from 1988 to the present.


Election results

Elections in the 2020s

2022 by-election

Elections in the 2010s

2019

2015

2011

Elections in the 2000s

2007

2003

Elections in the 1990s

1999

1995

1991

Elections in the 1980s

1988

1920 - 1988
District abolished

Elections in the 1910s

1917

1913

1910

Elections in the 1900s

1907

1904

1901

Elections in the 1890s

1898

1895

1894

References

New South Wales state electoral results by district